Tai Po Tau Shui Wai aka. Tai Po Tau Lo Wai is a Punti walled village in Tai Wo, Tai Po District, Hong Kong.

Administration
Tai Po Tau Shui Wai is a recognized village under the New Territories Small House Policy. It is one of the villages represented within the Tai Po Rural Committee. For electoral purposes, Tai Po Tau Shui Wai is part of the Po Nga constituency, which was formerly represented by Chow Yuen-wai until July 2021.

History
Tai Po Tau Shui Wai was established during the Song Dynasty by a branch of the Tang Clan of Kam Tin. The enclosing walls were constructed during the Ming Dynasty. A part of the Clan later branched out and settled in Tai Po Tau Tsuen.

See also
 Walled villages of Hong Kong

References

External links

 Delineation of area of existing village Tai Po Tau Shui Wai (Tai Po) for election of resident representative (2019 to 2022)

Walled villages of Hong Kong
Tai Po
Villages in Tai Po District, Hong Kong